Safia Otokoré (born Safia Ibrahim on October 17, 1969, in the French Territory of the Afars and the Issas, in present-day Djibouti) is a French politician and member of the Socialist Party.

Biography 
She was born to parents who were refugees from Somalia. She married Didier Otokoré, who at the time of their marriage played football for AJ Auxerre.

Otokoré ran marathons.

Political career 
Otokoré served as a regional councilor, vice president of the regional council, and an advisor for international development for Burgundy.

She was a supporter of Pierre Moscovici and often served as his press officer. In June 2012, she was a member of his ministerial cabinet in charge of communication.

She has consistently spoken out for women's rights and promoted sports.

Works 

 Safia Otokoré and Pauline Guéna, Safia: un conte de fées républicain, récit Safia Otokoré (Paris: J'AI LU, 2006) —autobiography (in French)

References 

1969 births
Living people
21st-century French women politicians
Djiboutian women in politics